Joseph Shaw Bolton  (1867–1946) was a British physician, pathologist, alienist, neurologist, and professor of medicine.

After education at Spring Hill School in Whitby, Bolton worked as an assistant without formal qualification at an asylum and as an assistant to a general practitioner in Manchester. He graduated BSc (Lond.) in 1888 and then studied at University College London Medical School. There he graduated MB in 1894 and then became demonstrator of anatomy. By 1896 he graduated MD. From 1896 to 1899 he was lecturer on physiology at Birmingham's Mason Science College. He was from 1899 to 1903 pathologist at Claybury Lunatic Asylum. He was a senior assistant at Hellingly's East Sussex County Asylum from 1903 to 1905 and then at the County Mental Hospital, Rainhill from 1905 to 1910. From 1910 to 1933 Bolton was director of Wakefield's West Riding Mental Hospital. At the University of Leeds he was appointed in 1911 to the professorial chair of mental diseases, holding the chair until his retirement as professor emeritus.

In Whitby in 1906 he married Ellen Rogers. They had two sons and one daughter. Charles Bolton, FRCP, was J. Shaw Bolton's younger brother.

Awards and honours
 1909 — FRCP
 1910 — Goulstonian Lecturer
 1925 — Maudsley Lecturer
 1928 — President of the Royal Medico-Psychological Association
 1933 — Henderson Trust Lecturer
 1935 — Lumleian Lecturer

References

1867 births
1946 deaths
British neurologists
19th-century English medical doctors
20th-century English medical doctors
Alumni of the UCL Medical School
Academics of the University of Leeds
Fellows of the Royal College of Physicians
People from Whitby